"Snuff" is a power ballad by American heavy metal band Slipknot. Released as the fifth and final single from their fourth album All Hope Is Gone on September 28, 2009, the song charted at number two on the Billboard Hot Mainstream Rock Tracks chart, their highest-charted single to date, surpassing "Dead Memories".

Roadrunner Records placed "Snuff" at number six for its greatest music videos of all time. The song was also nominated for Best Single at the Kerrang! Awards 2010, but lost to "Liquid Confidence" by You Me at Six.

It is the final single released from the band with original bassist Paul Gray before his death eight months after its release and drummer Joey Jordison before his departure in 2013 and death in 2021. During recent solo acoustic shows, Corey Taylor has performed an acoustic version of "Snuff" as a tribute to Gray.

"Snuff", "Psychosocial", "Dead Memories", "Wait and Bleed", "Sulfur", "Left Behind" and "Pulse of the Maggots" were released as downloadable songs in the Rock Band series.

Background

Music video
It was announced on October 14, 2009 by Roadrunner Records that a music video with a high enough production quality to be considered a short film was to be released for "Snuff", which premiered on December 18, 2009 at 11:09 PM CST. It was co-directed by Shawn "Clown" Crahan and P. R. Brown, and features Malcolm McDowell and Ashley Laurence of Hellraiser fame. Corey Taylor is seen for the third time in a Slipknot video without his mask (the other two times being: "Dead Memories" and "Before I Forget") and is cross-dressed at the end of the short film.

As of January 2023, the song has 150 million views on YouTube.

Track listing
Digital Download
 "Snuff" – 4:26

US one-track Promo CD
 "Snuff"

EU/US Promo CD
 "Snuff" (radio edit) – 4:11
 "Snuff" (album edit) – 4:36

Personnel

Slipknot
(#8) Corey Taylor – vocals, acoustic guitar
(#7) Mick Thomson – rhythm guitar
(#4) Jim Root – lead guitar
(#2) Paul Gray – bass
(#1) Joey Jordison – drums
(#6) Shawn Crahan – percussion, backing vocals, director
(#3) Chris Fehn – percussion, backing vocals
(#0) Sid Wilson – turntables, keyboards
(#5) Craig Jones – samples, media

Production
 Dave Fortman – producer
 Jeremy Parker – engineering
 Colin Richardson – mixer
 Matt Hyde – mix engineering
 Oli Wright – assistant engineering
 Ted Jensen – mastering

Charts

Weekly charts

Year-end charts

Certifications

References

2009 singles
2000s ballads
Slipknot (band) songs
Songs written by Corey Taylor
2008 songs
Roadrunner Records singles
Rock ballads
Songs written by Joey Jordison
Songs written by Paul Gray (American musician)
Songs written by Jim Root
American alternative rock songs
Emo songs